Eurotech may refer to:
 Eurotech (company)
 EuroTech Universities Alliance